The 2000–01 Hamburger SV season was the 113th season in the club's history.

Season summary
Hamburg slumped from third to 13th in the final table despite the 22 goals of the league's top scorer Sergej Barbarez, but still had a major role to play in the title race. In the final game of the season faced Bayern Munich, who had been three points ahead of Schalke as the final round begun. Schalke defeated Unterhaching 5–3, with the final whistle blown while Hamburg and Bayern were still playing. With Bayern conceding the game's first goal on the stroke of second-half added time it briefly appeared that the title was heading to Gelsenkirchen. However, Hamburg goalkeeper Mathias Schober - on loan from Schalke, and only playing his third game for the club - handled a back pass and thus conceded a free kick. After much delay, Bayern defender Patrik Andersson scored from the free kick, handing Bayern the draw they needed to secure their 16th Bundesliga title.

First team squad
Squad at end of season

Left club during season

Competitions

Bundesliga

League table

References

Notes

Hamburger SV seasons
Hamburger SV